Berlin is a city-state and the capital of the Federal Republic of Germany.

Capital city

Berlin is the capital of the Federal Republic of Germany. The President of Germany, whose functions are mainly ceremonial under the German constitution, has his official residence in Schloss Bellevue. Berlin is the seat of the German executive, housed in the Chancellery, the Bundeskanzleramt.

Facing the Chancellery is the Bundestag, the German Parliament, housed in the renovated Reichstag building since the government moved back to Berlin in 1998. The Bundesrat ("federal council", functioning as an upper house) is the representation of the Federal States (Bundesländer) of Germany and has its seat at the former Prussian House of Lords.

Ministries

The relocation of the federal government and Bundestag to Berlin was completed in 1999, however with some ministries as well as some minor departments retained in the federal city Bonn, the former capital of West Germany. Discussions to move the remaining branches continue. The ministries and departments of Defence, Justice and Consumer Protection, Finance, Interior, Foreign, Economic Affairs and Energy, Labour and Social Affairs
, Family Affairs, Senior Citizens, Women and Youth, Environment, Nature Conservation, Building and Nuclear Safety, Food and Agriculture, Economic Cooperation and Development, Health, Transport and Digital Infrastructure and Education and Research are based in the capital.

City-state

Since German reunification on 3 October 1990, Berlin has been one of three city-states (with Hamburg and Bremen) among Germany's 16 states. The city and state parliament is the House of Representatives, (Abgeordnetenhaus), with 141 seats. Berlin's executive body is the Senate of Berlin (Senat von Berlin). The Senate consists of the Governing Mayor (Regierender Bürgermeister) and up to eight senators with ministerial positions (one holding the official title "Mayor" (Bürgermeister) as deputy to the Governing Mayor). The Social Democratic Party (SPD) and The Left (Die Linke) took control of the city government after the 2001 state election, winning another term in the 2006 state election. The 2011 state election produced a coalition of the Social Democratic Party and the Christian Democratic Union.

The Governing Mayor is Lord Mayor of the city (Oberbürgermeister der Stadt) and Prime Minister of the federal state (Ministerpräsident des Bundeslandes). The office of Berlin's Governing Mayor is in the Rotes Rathaus (Red City Hall). From 2001 to 2014, this office was held by Klaus Wowereit of the SPD. Between 2014 and 2021 the position was held by Michael Müller, who was succeeded by Franziska Giffey. Both politicians are also of the SPD.

The total annual state budget of Berlin in 2007 exceeded €20.5 ($28.7) billion, which included a budget surplus of €80 ($112) million (the first surplus in the city-state's history). Due to increasing growth rates and tax revenues, the Senate of Berlin calculated an increasing budget surplus for 2008. The total budget was an estimated amount €5.5 ($7.7) billion, financed by the German government or the German Bundesländer. Primarily due to reunification-related expenditures, Berlin as a German state accumulated more debt than any other city in Germany (an estimated €60 ($84) billion in December 2007).

The city has ten state-level ministries (Senate Departments), each led by a Senator, plus the Senate Chancellery, which is the office of the Governing Mayor. It also has seven state-level agencies, such as the Berlin Immigration Office.

2016 election

< 2011    Next >
|-
!style="background-color:#E9E9E9" align=left colspan="2" rowspan="2" width=400 |Party
!style="background-color:#E9E9E9" align=center colspan="3" |Popular vote
!style="background-color:#E9E9E9" align=center colspan="3" |Seats
|-
!style="background-color:#E9E9E9" align=right width=60|Votes
!style="background-color:#E9E9E9" align=right width=40|%
!style="background-color:#E9E9E9" align=right width=50|+/–
!style="background-color:#E9E9E9" align=right width=30|Seats
!style="background-color:#E9E9E9" align=right width=30|+/–
|-
|  Sozialdemokratische Partei Deutschlands – SPD|| 352,369 || 21.6 || 6.7 || 38 || 10
|-
|  Christlich Demokratische Union Deutschlands – CDU|| 288,002 || 17.6 || 5.8 || 31 || 8
|-
|  Die Linke|| 255,740 || 15.6 || 4.0 || 27 || 7
|-
|  Bündnis 90/Die Grünen|| 248,243 || 15.2 || 2.4 || 27 || 3
|-
|  Alternative für Deutschland – AfD|| 231,325 || 14.2 || 14.2 || 25 || 25
|-
|  Freie Demokratische Partei – FDP|| 109,431 || 6.7 || 4.9 || 12 || 12
|-
|  || 31,908 || 2.0 || 1.1 || – || –
|-
|  || 30,565 || 1.9 || 0.4 || – || –
|-
|  || 28,321 || 1.7 || 7.2 || – || 15
|-
| || align=left |  || 18,135 || 1.1 || 1.1 || – || –
|-
| bgcolor="white"| || align=left |Other parties|| 40,717 || 2.4 ||  –|| – || –
|- style="background-color:#E9E9E9"
| align="right" colspan="2" | Valid votes
| 1,634,756
| 98.5%
| 0.1
| colspan=2 rowspan=2 color=#BAB9B9|
|- style="background-color:#E9E9E9"
| align="right" colspan="2" | Invalid votes
| 25,690
| 1.5%
| 0.1
|- style="background-color:#E9E9E9"
| align="right" colspan="2" | Totals and voter turnout
| 1,662,598	
| 66.9% 
| 6.7
| 160
| 
|- style="background-color:#BAB9B9"
| colspan="2" | Electorate
| 2,485,363
| 100.00
| —
| colspan=2|
|-
| colspan=11 align=left | Source:
|}

Boroughs

Berlin is divided into twelve boroughs (Bezirke), reduced from 23 boroughs before Berlin's 2001 administrative reform. Each borough has a number of localities (Ortsteile), which often have historic roots in older municipalities predating the formation of Greater Berlin on 1 October 1920 and were urbanised and incorporated into the city. Many residents strongly identify with their localities (or boroughs). Berlin has 96 localities, commonly made up of several city neighbourhoods (known as Kiez in the Berlin dialect).

Each borough is governed by a council (Bezirksamt) with five councillors (Bezirksstadträte) and a borough mayor (Bezirksbürgermeister). The borough council is elected by the borough assembly (Bezirksverordnetenversammlung). The boroughs of Berlin are not independent municipalities; the borough governments' power is limited, and subordinate to the Berlin Senate. The borough mayors form a council of mayors (Rat der Bürgermeister, led by the city's governing mayor), which advises the Senate. The localities have no local government bodies, and the administrative duties of the former locality representative (the Ortsvorsteher) were assumed by the borough mayors.

Sister cities

Berlin maintains official partnerships with 17 cities. Town twinning between Berlin and other cities began with Los Angeles in 1967. East Berlin's partnerships were cancelled at German reunification, but later partially reestablished. West Berlin's partnerships were limited to the borough level. During the Cold War the partnerships reflected spheres of influence, with West Berlin partnering with Western capitals and East Berlin partnering primarily with cities of the Warsaw Pact and its allies.

There are joint projects with a number of other cities, such as Belgrade, Copenhagen, Helsinki, Johannesburg, Shanghai, Seoul, Sofia, Sydney and Vienna. Berlin participates in international city associations such as the Union of the Capitals of the European Union, Eurocities, Network of European Cities of Culture, Metropolis, Summit Conference of the World's Major Cities, Conference of the World's Capital Cities. Its sister cities are:

 1967 Los Angeles, United States
 1987 Paris, France
 1988 Madrid, Spain
 1989 Vienna, Austria
 1989 Istanbul, Turkey
 1991 Warsaw, Poland
 1991 Moscow, Russia
 1991 Budapest, Hungary
 1992 Brussels, Belgium
 1993 Jakarta, Indonesia
 1993 Tashkent, Uzbekistan
 1993 Mexico City, Mexico
 1993 Bern, Switzerland
 1994 Beijing, China
 1994 Tokyo, Japan
 1994 Buenos Aires, Argentina
 1995 Prague, Czech Republic
 2000 Vaduz, Liechtenstein
 2000 Windhoek, Namibia
 2000 London, United Kingdom

Security

Berlin Police

The Berlin Police (Der Polizeipräsident in Berlin' - The Police Chief of Berlin), or commonly Berliner Polizei is the German Landespolizei force for the city-state of Berlin. Law enforcement in Germany is divided between federal and state (Land) agencies. Berlin Police is divided into 6 local directorates (Direktion). Each local directorate is responsible for one to three Berliner districts:

Direktion 1: Reinickendorf, Pankow
Direktion 2: Spandau, Charlottenburg-Wilmersdorf
Direktion 3: Mitte
Direktion 4: Tempelhof-Schöneberg, Steglitz-Zehlendorf
Direktion 5: Friedrichshain-Kreuzberg, Neukölln
Direktion 6: Marzahn-Hellersdorf, Treptow-Köpenick, Lichtenberg

Federal Police

The Federal Police (Bundespolizei or BPOL) is a (primarily) uniformed federal police force in Berlin and Germany. It is subordinate to the Federal Ministry of the Interior (Bundesministerium des Innern (BMI)).

The Bundespolizei can also be used to reinforce state police if requested by a state (Land) government. The BPOL maintains these reserve forces to deal with major demonstrations, disturbances or emergencies, supplementing the capabilities of the State Operational Support Units.  Several highly trained detachments are available for crisis situations requiring armored cars, water cannon or other special equipment.

BPOL has investigators conduct criminal investigations only within its jurisdiction; otherwise the cases are referred to the appropriate state police force or to the federal criminal investigative agency, the Federal Criminal Police (Bundeskriminalamt, BKA). In addition, the Bundespolizei cooperates closely with German state executive authorities, such as prosecutor's offices (Staatsanwaltschaft) in pursuing criminal investigations.

The Bundespolizei has the following missions:
 Border security (Grenzpolizei or Grepo), to include passport control 
 Protection of federal buildings such as Schloss Bellevue, the residence of the German Bundespräsident.
 Providing the federal government's mobile response force for internal security events.
 Providing transportation security at international airports and on the German railways.
 Providing counter-terrorism forces (GSG 9).
 Providing air (or sky) marshals.
 Supporting international police missions for the United Nations and the EU 
 Providing in-house security for some German embassies.
 Providing rescue helicopter service.

See also

List of people from Berlin
Politics of Germany
European Union

References